Edward Emily (24 May 1740 – 20 June 1792) was a Dean of the Church of Ireland.

He was born in West Clandon; educated at Westminster School and Trinity College, Cambridge; and ordained in 1766. He held livings at Chesham, Wilden, Motcombe and West Lavington. He was Dean of Derry from 1781 until 1783.

References

1740 births
1792 deaths
People educated at Westminster School, London
Alumni of Trinity College, Cambridge
18th-century Irish Anglican priests
Deans of Derry
People from Surrey